Əski İqrığ (also, Əski İqriq, Aski Igrykh, Ezki-Igrik, and Kevna-Igrykh’) is a village and municipality in the Quba Rayon of Azerbaijan.  It has a population of 325.

References 

Populated places in Quba District (Azerbaijan)